Heavy Eyes is the debut studio album from Canadian indie rock band Basement Revolver. It was released in the UK by fear of missing out records and in Canada by Sonic Unyon. The album combines hardcore indie rock with dream pop influences, and has been described by vocalist and songwriter Chrisy Hurn as a "bit of a deep dive into myself".

Track listing
All songs written by Chrisy Hurn.

 Baby - 3:51
 Johnny - 3:30
 Dancing - 3:14
 Friends - 3:19
 Knocking - 4:56
 Johnny, Pt. 2 - 3:55
 Words - 3:16
 Wait - 2:56
 Tree Trunks - 3:40
 You're Okay - 3:32
 Heavy Eyes - 3:15
 Diamonds - 4:37

Personnel
 Chrisy Hurn - guitar/vocals
 Nimal Agalawatte - bass guitar
 Brandon Munro - drums

References

External links
Heavy Eyes on Discogs (list of releases)

2018 debut albums
Basement Revolver albums